"Love Put a Song in My Heart" is a song written by Ben Peters, and recorded by American country music artist Johnny Rodriguez.

Background
"Love Put a Song in My Heart" was released in September 1975 as the first single and title track from the album Love Put a Song in My Heart. Rodriguez's version includes a Spanish translation of the refrain after a key change.

Chart performance
The song was the last of six number ones on the country chart for Rodriguez. The single stayed at number one for one week and spent a total of eleven weeks on the country chart.

References

1975 songs
1975 singles
Johnny Rodriguez songs
Songs written by Ben Peters
Song recordings produced by Jerry Kennedy
Mercury Records singles